The Ellesmere Island Volcanics are a Late Cretaceous volcanic group of volcanoes and lava flows in the Qikiqtaaluk Region of northern Ellesmere Island, Nunavut, Canada.

Ellesmere Island Volcanics are part of the Arctic Cordillera. This volcanic province is among the northernmost volcanism on Earth.

History 
Even though these volcanics are about 90 million years old, the volcanoes and cinder are still discernible. The volcanics of the Maskell Inlet Assemblage are mostly made up of tuffs, with smaller flows. Compositionally these are mostly andesite or undifferentiated andesite/basalt.

The volcanics on Ellesmere Island has been uncertainly associated to both the early volcanic activity of the Iceland hotspot and the Alpha Ridge. The Ellesmere Island Volcanics are part of the High Arctic Large Igneous Province.

See also
Volcanism of Canada
Volcanism of Northern Canada
List of volcanoes in Canada
Strand Fiord Formation
Iceland plume

References

Volcanism of Nunavut
Landforms of Qikiqtaaluk Region
Cretaceous volcanism
Volcanic groups
Volcanoes of the Arctic Ocean